Dandelion
Lantana
Convolvulus arvensis
Thistle
Typha latifolia
Datura stramonium
Calotropis
Justicia adhatoda 
Rhododendron ponticum 
Water Hyacinth 
Morina 
Ephedra 
Campylanthus ramosissimus (Plantaginaceae)

See also
Wildflowers
Wildlife of Pakistan

References
http://www.wssp.org.pk/12414.htm